The Valentine Falls is a waterfall on the Valentine Creek in the Snowy Mountains region of New South Wales, Australia.

The waterfall flows in many sections with several pools.

See also

 List of waterfalls of Australia

References

External links

 

Waterfalls of New South Wales
Kosciuszko National Park
Snowy Valleys Council